Black Cocaine is the second EP by Canadian singer-songwriter Margeaux. It was released on October 12, 2017. The lead single, "Bad Chick", was released on June 14, 2017.

Track listing

Release history

References

2017 EPs